Meghan Lino (born 13 August 1984) is an American wheelchair curler who competes in international level events.

References

External links

1984 births
Living people
People from Falmouth, Massachusetts
American female curlers
American wheelchair curlers
Wheelchair curlers at the 2014 Winter Paralympics
Wheelchair curlers at the 2018 Winter Paralympics
Paralympic wheelchair curlers of the United States